Lesley Belleau is an Anishinaabe writer from Canada. She is most noted for her 2017 poetry collection Indianland, which won the Pat Lowther Award in 2018.

A member of the Garden River First Nation near Sault Ste. Marie, Ontario, she has studied English literature at the University of Windsor and Indigenous studies at Trent University.

References

21st-century Canadian poets
21st-century Canadian women writers
21st-century First Nations writers
Canadian women poets
First Nations poets
First Nations women writers
People from Algoma District
Writers from Ontario
University of Windsor alumni
Living people
Year of birth missing (living people)